Les Handley (29 December 1918 – 11 January 1995) was an  Australian rules footballer who played with St Kilda in the Victorian Football League (VFL).

Notes

External links 

1918 births
1995 deaths
Australian rules footballers from Victoria (Australia)
St Kilda Football Club players